Colonel Standish Darby O'Grady, 2nd Viscount Guillamore (26 December 1792 – 22 July 1848) from Cahir Guillamore, County Limerick, was an Anglo-Irish politician and British Army officer.

Biography
O'Grady was born on 26December 1792, the eldest son of Standish O'Grady, 1st Viscount Guillamore, and  Katherine, daughter of John Thomas Waller of Castletown. He was educated at Westminster School by 1809; and Trinity College, Dublin (1809).

Military career
O'Grady was commissioned into the British army as an ensign in the 7th Hussars in 1811. Promoted to lieutenant in 1812, he fought in the Waterloo Campaign in the 7th Hussars. On 17June 1815, he had command of the troop of the 7th Hussars on the high road from Genappe to Quatre Bras and was involved in the action at Genappe. The regiment was covering the British march from Quatre Bras to Waterloo. Sir William Dörnberg left O'Grady outside the town on the Quatre Bras road to hold in check the advancing French cavalry while the main body of the regiment proceeded in file across the narrow bridge of Genappe and up the steep street of the town. O'Grady advanced at the head of his troops as soon as the French appeared, and presented so bold a front that, after a time, they retired. When they were out of sight, he crossed the bridge at the entrance of Genappe. He took his troop at a gallop through the town, rejoining Sir William Dörnberg, who had drawn up the main body of the regiment on the sloping road at the Waterloo end of Genappe. A severe cavalry combat ensued when the French lancers reached the top of the town, in which O'Grady's regiment made a gallant charge, with considerable loss.

The next day at the Battle of Waterloo he was stationed on the ground above Hougoumont on the British right. He wrote in a letter to his father just after the battle:

Two letters of his to Captain William Siborne, describing the movements of his regiments on 17 and 18 June 1815, are printed in Waterloo Letters, edited by Major-General H. T. Siborne (London, 1891, pp. 130–6).
His military career continued in fits and starts. After Waterloo, he was promoted to captain, but was put into the reserves ("on half-pay") the next year, probably because his father wanted him to enter politics. However, he failed to get into parliament and went back on active service as a captain in the 18th Dragoons in 1819. After his election to parliament, he was again placed in the reserves in 1821. In 1825, still in the reserves, he was promoted to major. He was placed on active service with the 24th Foot from 1828 until 1829 when he was again placed in the reserves. In 1842 he was promoted to Colonel and became aide-de-camp to Queen Victoria the same year—a post he held until he died.

Political career
He was defeated on his first attempt in 1818 but was elected in 1820 as Member of Parliament for County Limerick, and held the seat until 1826. His early period in Parliament was dominated by controversy over a parliamentary inquiry into his father's conduct as a judge. James Grattan emerged as an opponent of O'Grady in this issue and it is known they fought a duel in July 1822. O'Grady was a vigorous defender of the rights of his constituents and in 1823 on behalf of Limerick Corporation, he opposed a plan by Spring Rice the MP for Limerick City to reform the borough. In 1825 he voted to suppress the Catholic Association and later the same year he refused to attend a meeting in Limerick that supported Catholic Emancipation, both these made him unpopular amongst his Catholic constituents. He was defeated in the 1826 election. Though there was a movement to have him appointed as High Sheriff of County Limerick it was ignored because after his defeat O'Grady rejoined the army in the 24th Foot which were stationed in Limerick at that time. 

After the death of Thomas Lloyd in 1829, O'Grady was again returned for County Limerick on 2February 1830, this time with the support of Daniel O'Connell. His support was firm with his Catholic constituents by this stage but on 3 May his name was struck from the electoral return and replaced with that of James Dawson, previously the MP for Clonmel. O'Grady was returned unopposed later that year in the general election. Despite a strong challenge by a Repeal candidate in the 1832 general election he was again returned. In the 1835 election he retired and was replaced by William Smith O'Brien.

Later life

He succeeded to the peerage as Viscount Guillamore on 21April 1840 on the death of his father, the 1st Viscount.

O'Grady died suddenly in Dublin on 22July 1848.

Family
On 16October 1828, he married Gertrude-Jane (died 1871), daughter of Berkeley Paget and Sophia Bucknall. Among their children were:
Honourable Sophia O'Grady (b.1829), who married in 1862 Edward Wilmot Williams, JP, DL (b1826), an officer in the Begal Cavalry
Honourable Gertrude O'Grady (b.1831), who married in 1855 Colonel Thomas C. Norbury, CB (d.1899), and left issue
Standish (1832–1860), third Viscount Guillamore, who left a daughter:
Honourable Cecilia O'Grady (b.1855), who married in 1877 Edward Roche, 2nd Baron Fermoy (1850–1920)
Honourable Kathleen Elanor Henrietta O'Grady (b.1834), who married in 1855 James H. August Steuart (d.1895)
Paget Standish (1835–1877) fourth Viscount Guillamore
Honourable Reginald Grimston Standish O'Grady (d.1874), who married in 1867 Frances Arabella Beresford, daughter of Rt Hon. William Beresford
Hardress Standish (1841–1918) fifth Viscount Guillamore, unmarried
Honourable Annabel O'Grady (b.1843), who married in 1873 Hugh Melvil Freeling (d.1906), of the Freeling baronets (a grandson of the 1st Baronet)
Frederick Standish (1847–1927) sixth Viscount Guillamore, who married in 1881 Mary Theresa Burdett Coventry, daughter of Hon. William James Coventry, who was son of George Coventry, 7th Earl of Coventry

Notes

References

Attribution:

Further reading

External links 
 
 

    
    
    

    
    
    

    
    
    

    
    
    

1782 births
1848 deaths
Politicians from County Limerick
Guillamore, Standish O'Grady, 1st Viscount
Members of the Parliament of the United Kingdom for County Limerick constituencies (1801–1922)
UK MPs 1820–1826
UK MPs 1830–1831
UK MPs 1831–1832
UK MPs 1832–1835
UK MPs who inherited peerages
O'Grady family
7th Queen's Own Hussars officers
British Army personnel of the Napoleonic Wars